This is a discography of all releases by Belgian artist Ozark Henry.

Studio albums

EPs

Compilation albums

Live albums

Soundtracks

DVDs

Singles

Sunzoo Manley

As producer

References

Discographies of Belgian artists
Rock music discographies